A Belgian identity card is a national identity card issued to all citizens of Belgium aged 12 years old and above.

Foreigners resident in Belgium are issued with a Belgian resident card (Dutch: Verblijfstitel, French: Titre de séjour, German: Aufenthaltstitel), which appears similar, but is legally distinct.

Nevertheless, the term "identity card" is often used to refer to both the identity cards issued to citizens and the resident cards issued to foreigners.

Card types 
The main card types currently in issuance are as follows:

Third country nationals refers to foreigners who are not EU/EEA/Swiss nationals.

Card description

Physical format 
Cards are issued according to the ISO/IEC 7810 standard using the ID-1 size format, similar to credit cards.

They conform to ISO/IEC 7816 and have a 3-line machine-readable strip on the back starting with IDBEL.

Cards issued to Belgian citizens and EU/EEA/Swiss citizens 
Cards issued to Belgian citizens and EU/EEA/Swiss citizens are green. They carry a heading of "BELGIUM" and the type of card (e.g. "IDENTITY CARD" or "EU+ Card"), written in all three national languages (Dutch, French and German) as well as in English. The remaining fields are bilingual - English in combination with either Dutch, French or German - depending on the official language of the place of residence of the subject.

If the place of residence is a Brussels municipality, the holder may choose between French or Dutch. If the place of residence is a municipality with language facilities, the holder may choose between French or Dutch, or French or German, depending on the local language facilities.

Cards issued to third country nationals 
Cards issued to third country nationals are red and blue, in common with the standard EU format. This includes H cards (despite their full name as European Blue Cards) and M cards. All such cards carry a heading of "BEL" and "TITRE DE SÉJOUR" or "VERBLIJFSTITEL" or "AUFENTHALTSTITEL".

The title and all fields are monolingual - in Dutch, French or German - depending on the official language of the place of residence of the subject.

Printed information 
Cards are printed with the following information relating to the subject:
 photograph of the person's face
 names (surname and the first two given names)
sex
nationality
 National Register number
signature
Cards also bear the following information about the card itself:
type of card
card number
 place and date of issue (place of issue being the name of the municipality or embassy)
expiry date
In addition, cards issued to foreigners contain:
place and date of birth
special observations (e.g. their labour market rights)
Historically cards were printed with the holder's residential address, but this is no longer shown on cards issued since 2005.

Other possible printed information includes nobility title (where applicable) and/or marital status (optional).

Digital information 
Cards issued since 2005 contain a chip, which includes additional information, including:

 two digital certificates (authentication and, for adults, signing)
 residential address
 up to two fingerprints (since 2020)

National Register number and card number 
Cards include two numbers that should not be confused with each other.

The National Register number is issued to the person upon their first registration (i.e. usually at birth for Belgian citizens) and held for life. It comprises 11 digits in the form yy.mm.dd-xxx.cd where yy.mm.dd is the birth date, xxx is a sequential number (odd for males and even for females) and cd a check-digit.

The card number applies only to the card in question and can take several different formats:

 Belgian citizens: 12 digits in the form xxx-xxxxxxx-yy where yy is a check digit calculated as the remainder of dividing xxxxxxxxxx by 97 (if the remainder is 0, the check number is set to 97)
 Third country nationals: nine digits in the form xxxxxxx xx
 EU/EEA/Swiss citizens: a letter and nine digits in the form B xxxxxxx xx

Administration

Issuance 
Residents of Belgium (both Belgian citizens and foreigners) receive their identity/resident cards from their local municipality.

Belgian citizens who are resident abroad can apply for renewal of their identity card at their local Belgian embassy or consulate.

The cost is usually approximately €25 (as of 2020) depending on the municipality or embassy.

Manufacture 
The cards are manufactured by the Thales Group and over 28 million have been issued.

Usage

Proof of identity 
All people on Belgian territory are required to carry identity documentation at all times and produce such documentation if and when requested by the police and other government authorities.

Belgian citizens aged 15 and above are required to carry their identity card.

Foreigners are required to carry either their resident card (if resident) or otherwise an identity card issued by another European country or their passport.

Domestic usage 
Identity/resident cards are frequently used in daily life in Belgium, including for the following purposes:

 Managing personal affairs with government agencies
 Attending medical appointments (in hospitals and at doctors' offices)
 Collecting prescription medication at pharmacies

Identity/resident cards can also be used together with a card reader to access online services and conduct operations such as:

 Signing and consulting documents
 Completing a tax return
 Consulting information held by government agencies, such as the Belgian National Register, the finance department (MyMinfin), the pension department (MyPension).
 Opening a bank account online

Travel document 
Belgian citizens are entitled to use their identity card for international travel to the following regions/countries:
 All EU countries: Austria, Bulgaria, Croatia, Cyprus, Czech Republic, Denmark (including Faroe Islands and Greenland), Estonia, Finland, France (including Overseas France), Germany, Greece, Hungary, Ireland, Italy, Latvia, Lithuania, Luxembourg, Malta, Netherlands (excluding Dutch Caribbean), Poland, Portugal, Romania, Slovakia, Slovenia, Spain (including Ceuta and Melilla) and Sweden
All other Schengen Area countries: Iceland, Liechtenstein, Norway, Switzerland and the three European microstates which are de facto members of the Schengen Area (Monaco, San Marino and Vatican City)
Most other European countries: Andorra, Albania, Bosnia and Herzegovina, Georgia, Gibraltar, Kosovo, Moldova (including Transnistria), Montenegro, North Macedonia, Northern Cyprus, Serbia and Turkey
Selected other non-European countries: Egypt, The Gambia (entering via Banjul Airport), Jordan (on a group visa entering via Aqaba Airport) and Tunisia (on a group tour)

Identity cards are not valid for travel to Belarus, Russia, Ukraine or the United Kingdom (terminated on 30 September 2021).

Resident cards issued to foreigners are technically not identity cards (in the EU/EEA context) and are therefore not valid for international travel. Foreigners must use a travel document issued by their country of citizenship for travel purposes.

See also
Belgian nationality law
Belgian passport
Visa requirements for Belgian citizens
National identity cards in the European Union

References

Society of Belgium
Government of Belgium
National identity cards by country

nl:Identiteitskaart